Irvington is a planned Bay Area Rapid Transit (BART) infill station in the Irvington District of Fremont, California. , estimates from the city anticipated construction to begin in 2024, with the station opening for service in 2031.

History

The station has been planned since it was studied as part of the Warm Springs extension in 1979, and its construction was approved by the BART board in 1992.

The Warm Springs extension began construction through the Irvington District in 2009, to connect Fremont and Warm Springs. The proposed station at the center of Irvington, once considered optional, was part of the extension. However funding for construction of the station fell through. The station had been envisioned for completion in 2015. Provisions for personnel access and preliminary foundation work were included when track was laid through the site.

The city of Fremont had planned to finance the $140 million station through redevelopment agency bonds in 2009, but the bonds were cancelled when the California State Legislature abolished the redevelopment agency. In 2014, Measure BB and the Alameda County Transportation Expenditure Plan received voter approval with $120 million listed for the Irvington BART station that was contingent on full definition of the capital project and its inclusion in a future Capital Improvement Program. A reevaluation of the environmental impact study was undertaken by the city in 2017.

The BART Board of Directors confirmed they had voted to authorize the Irvington station in August 2019, with construction to start in August 2022 and complete by August 2026. As of November 2022, the start of construction was pushed back to mid-2024 and the station opening to 2031.

References

External links
 City of Fremont - Irvington BART Station Project

Future Bay Area Rapid Transit stations
Fremont, California
Railway stations scheduled to open in 2031